During the 1999–2000 English football season, Notts County F.C. competed in the Football League Second Division.

Season summary
Despite the departure of manager Sam Allardyce to his old club, Bolton Wanderers, in October, Notts County enjoyed a strong season in the Second Division to finish 8th, although they finished some distance from the higher-placed promotion contenders, finishing 15 points behind the team that finished just above them, Bristol Rovers.

Squad

Left club during season

Final league table

Results

Notts County's score comes first

Legend

Football League Division Two

League Cup

FA Cup

Football League Trophy

Squad statistics
Appearances for competitive matches only

References
 Soccerbase.com

External links

Notts County F.C. seasons
Notts County F.C.